Eskelin is a surname. Notable people with the surname include:

Ellery Eskelin (born 1959), American tenor saxophonist
Ian Eskelin (born 1969), American record producer, songwriter, and solo artist

See also
Ed Eskelin Ranch